Aleksandr Klimenko may refer to:
 Alyaksandr Klimenka (born 1983), Belarusian international footballer
 Aleksandr Klimenko (shot putter) (1970–2000), Ukrainian shot putter
 Aleksandr Klimenko (footballer), Turkmen footballer and coach